These are lists of the tallest buildings in Chatswood, Sydney, New South Wales, Australia. In accordance with CTBUH guidelines, heights are measured to the structural height, which includes architectural elements, such as spires, but not communications antennas. Structures are not included.

Tallest completed and topped out buildings 
This is a list of the tallest buildings in Chatswood which are completed or topped out:

See also 

 List of tallest buildings in Sydney
 List of tallest buildings in Australia
 List of tallest buildings in Oceania

References

External links 
 Chatswood - CTBUH

Chatswood
Tallest buildings in Chatswood